Alston Conrad S. Ryan (born 9 October 1993) is an Antigua and Barbuda boxer. He competed in the men's lightweight event at the 2020 Summer Olympics.

References

External links
 

1993 births
Living people
Antigua and Barbuda male boxers
Olympic boxers of Antigua and Barbuda
Boxers at the 2020 Summer Olympics
Place of birth missing (living people)
Pan American Games medalists in boxing
Boxers at the 2019 Pan American Games
Pan American Games bronze medalists for Antigua and Barbuda
Medalists at the 2019 Pan American Games